In Somniphobia is the ninth studio album released by Japanese extreme metal band Sigh. It was released on 13 March 2012 under the independent record label Candlelight Records.

Track listing 
All music and lyrics by Mirai Kawashima except where noted.

Personnel

Sigh 
 Mirai Kawashima – vocals, piano, Minimoog, Prophet-5, Clavinet D-6, organ, Roland RE-201, vocoder, ring modulator, recorder, sitar, tabla, tampura, shortwave radio, jaw harp, glockenspiel
 Dr. Mikannibal – alto saxophone, vocals
 Satoshi Fujinami – bass
 Shinichi Ishikawa – guitar
 Junichi Harashima – drums

Guest musicians 
 Metatron – vocals and narration on tracks 3 and 8
 Kam Lee – vocals on track 7
 Barmanu – sarangi
 Adam Matlock – clarinet on tracks 6 and 11, accordion on track 8
 Jonathan Fisher – trumpet on tracks 8 and 11

Other personnel 
 Takamichi Osada – engineering
 Tim Turan – mastering
 Eliran Kantor – artwork
 Tenkotsu Kawaho – photos

References 

2012 albums
Sigh (band) albums
Candlelight Records albums
Albums with cover art by Eliran Kantor